Mount Hopeless is a mountain in the Murweh Shire of Queensland.

Hopeless